Rex Stratton Kirton  is a New Zealand local-body politician in the Wellington Region. He was mayor of Upper Hutt for 24 years until 2001, and then served three terms on the Greater Wellington Regional Council.

Biography
Kirton attended St. Patrick's College, Silverstream 1955–1959. He lives in Whitemans Valley.

Local government
Kirton was first elected mayor of Upper Hutt in 1977. When he retired from this role in 2001, he was the longest-serving mayor in New Zealand at that time.  In 2001, Kirton stood as the Upper Hutt representative on the Wellington Regional Council. He served three terms until 2010 when he was beaten by Paul Swain.  Swain and Kirton received 5,117 and 3,794 votes, respectively, with two other candidates contesting the election.  In 2007, he had been returned unopposed.   He was chairman of the regional council's parks, forests and utilities committee.

In 1990, Kirton received the New Zealand 1990 Commemoration Medal. In the 1997 New Year Honours, he was appointed a Companion of the Queen's Service Order, for public services. Kirton Drive, the main street in the suburb of Riverstone Terraces, is named after him.

References

Year of birth missing (living people)
Living people
Mayors of places in the Wellington Region
People from Upper Hutt
Companions of the Queen's Service Order
People educated at St. Patrick's College, Silverstream
Wellington regional councillors